"The Carpal Tunnel of Love" is a song by American rock band Fall Out Boy from their 2007 album Infinity on High. It is the tenth track on the album.

Background
In mid-November 2006, "The Carpal Tunnel of Love" was the first taste of Infinity on High when the band made it available online via AbsolutePunk, before a pre-album release to iTunes on December 12, 2006 as a digital single. In addition, a web-exclusive video was released, but later saw televised airplay on Music Choice On-Demand. The song debuted on the US Billboard Hot 100 at number No. 81 on the strength of digital downloads and minor airplay, also coming in at No. 67 on the defunct-Pop 100.

The song was featured in the Sony video game, MLB 07: The Show.

Composition
"The Carpal Tunnel of Love" has been referred to as "a prime slab of what the boys have become famous for: highly caffeinated pop-punk mixed with a little white-boy soul and some hard-core yelping." The song features Stump singing in a falsetto in the chorus over Trohman's "crunchy" guitars, as well as a breakdown in which Wentz employs unclean vocals, similar to how he used to in his former band, Arma Angelus. It is one of two Fall Out Boy singles to feature Pete Wentz's screams; the other is "Saturday".

Lyrical content
Elements of Wentz's lyrics were alleged to have been stolen from the works of Give Up the Ghost/Some Girls singer and lyricist Wesley Eisold, who sued the band for copyright infringement after the song was released. Eisold was credited as an "inspirador" in the album liner notes in all versions of the albums. Fall Out Boy settled out of court. The song title is a pun referring to masturbation, combining carpal tunnel syndrome and the tunnel of love amusement ride.

Music video
On February 6, 2007, the music video was made available on Fall Out Boy's website and was directed by Happy Tree Friends creator Kenn Navarro. The video features Happy Tree Friends characters and cartoon versions of the band in a plot where Cuddles and Giggles have fallen in love, and Cuddles' attempts to express his love to Giggles. All of the characters, including the Fall Out Boy members, get killed in graphic and ultraviolent ways in this video.

Charts

References

External links
"The Carpal Tunnel of Love" on Fall Out Boy's website 

2007 singles
Animated music videos
Fall Out Boy songs
Happy Tree Friends
Songs written by Pete Wentz
Songs written by Patrick Stump
2006 songs
Island Records singles
Song recordings produced by Neal Avron